Club Deportivo Dragón is a Salvadoran football club, based in San Miguel, El Salvador; founded in 1939. Dragón has won the league title twice in the 1951 and 1953 and finished as runner-up on three occasions.

CD Dragón have played their home games at the 10,000 capacity Estadio Juan Francisco Barraza since 1956 when the stadium was built.

Their traditional home kit consists of Green and White shirts (striped) with white shorts and green socks.

The club has a long-standing rivalry with national opponents Águila, and matches between the two sides are known as the "Derby Migueleño".

History
C.D. Dragón was founded on 18 September 1939; during this period no national league was available, so they played against teams from different zones. Dragón represented San Miguel department.
Dragón played their matches at the Estadio Charlaix, which would be their home stadium for several decades.
Under the coaching of player-coach Esteban Blanco, the direction of Samuel Córdoba and key players such as Juan Francisco Barraza, Rómulo Granados and Domingo Flores, the club experienced their most successful period in the 1950s, when they won two league titles (1950–51, 1953–53) and lost two other championship finals.

However, Dragón's fortune would change when a new club was founded during the latter part of the 1950s, Águila. Águila began to assume the mantle as the top representative of San Miguel and began to drain Dragón of quality players such as (Barraza, Blanco and others), sponsorship and fans which led to Dragón not only developing a fierce rivalry with Águila but also led to the club being relegated to the Second Division after the conclusion of the 1963–64 season.

The club spent 13 years in the Second Division, during this time they were one of the founding members of UCLA (Unión de Clubes de Liga de Ascenso) in 1971. However, on 12 February 1977, under Brazilian coach Jorge Tupinambá who had previously coached ANTEL and Platense to the First Division, helped Dragón win their promotion game against Santiagueño 1–0 and helped elevate Dragón back to the First Division.

Dragón's stay in the First Division was a short one (four years), the club only achieved two final series participations during the 1977–78, 1978–79 where they were quickly eliminated and the club was relegated to the Second Division after the conclusion of the 1980 season.

Under the coaching of former player and idol Juan Francisco Barraza, the club almost achieved promotion back to the First Division during the 1984–85 season; however, they lost their promotion game to CESSA and had to wait another four years to gain promotion.

Mario Martínez, whose name will become entwined with Dragón, helped the club gain promotion to the First Division thanks to a 2–1 aggregate victory over Halcón de San Cayetano Istepeque, during this period a new crop of talented players were identified including future highest goalscorer for the El Salvador national football team Raúl Díaz Arce, Moisés "Pecho de Mono" González, and others.
Despite the success, the club were struck with financial troubles and had to sell those players and in just one season the club was relegated back to the Second Division.

The club waited four years to achieve promotion once again thanks to the coaching of Miguel Aguilar Obando, who helped Dragón win their promotion game 4–0 over Arcense.

Their most recent spell in the top tier lasted from 1996 through 2003; during this period several players shone including Honduran Williams Reyes, William Torres and others and they achieved a few final series. However they were relegated back in 2003 to the Second Division and have played there for ten years.

Dragón won promotion to the First Division mainly due to the coaching of Mario Martínez second time in which he helped C.D. Dragón gain promotion, Dragón defeated Ciclón del Golfo over the two legs with an aggregate score of 3–1.

Despite having a very poor Apertura campaign in which Mario Martínez was sacked and replaced by Nelson Ancheta, with the recruitment of club legend Williams Reyes and the emergence of stars like Rommel Mejía, Santos Ortíz, and Aurelio Vásquez the club reached the Clausura grand final (after disposing Santa Tecla in a play-off series 2–1, and defeating league leaders FAS in the semi-finals 1–0 on aggregate), However, despite the game ending 0–0 after 120 minutes, two missed penalties in the shootout meant that Isidro Metapán would win the grand final 6–5 on penalties.

On 29 of May, 2016, the club had its most successful period in its modern history under the guidance of Salvadorian Omar Sevilla, the club were able to win their first championship in 63 years (the Clausura 2016 final). Dragón won the match 1–0, Wilman Torres was the lone goal-scorer for Dragón in the final..

However, despite winning their first championship in 63 years their fortune dwindled first showed a poor international performance at the concacaf losing 3 games and drawing one, with 6–0 loss against Deportivo Saprissa being the worst of the result.

Soon the club struggled to win games and eventually during the 2017–2018 season, the club finished equal 12th with Sonsonate, this meant they were forced to play a relegation playoff game with Sonsonate, they lost 3–2, which meant they to fell back to the Segunda division.

On the 14th of January, 2018 due to failed payment to player, the club would not be registered and caused the club to be de-registered from the Segunda Division .

After a change of coach, hiring Marvin Benites and mixing a blend of experience and youth. Dragon won the Clausura 2022 tournament defeating Inter SS 2-1, with the goals coming from Javier Fermán and Henry Álvarez.

On 6 June 2022, after 4 years out of the Primera Division, Dragon were promoted back to the top flight following a 4-2 playoff victory against Apertura 2021 champion AD Municipal 4-2 with goals coming from Kevin Moreno, Henry Álvarez and a double from Romel Mejía.

Performance in CONCACAF competitions
CONCACAF Champions League: 1 appearances
Best: Group stage in 2016
2016–17 : Group stage

Historical Matches

Stadium
 Estadio Juan Francisco Barraza (1956–Present)
 Estadio Jose Ramon Flores; Santa Rosa de Lima (2016–2017) games played in this location, during the renovation of the Estadio Juan Francisco Barraza
 Estadio Charlaix; San Miguel (1939–55) Dragón home ground before moving to the Estadio Juan Francisco Barraza.
 Estadio Flor Blanca; San Salvador (TBD) International games prior to the building of Estadio Cuscatlán.
 Estadio Cuscatlán; San Salvador (2016) games played in this location for CONCACAF Champion League games, during the renovation of the Estadio Juan Francisco Barraza
 Cancha de Chapeltique (2017) games played in this location, during the renovation of the Estadio Juan Francisco Barraza

Dragón plays its home games at Estadio Juan Francisco Barraza located in San Miguel, The stadium has a capacity of 10,000 people.

Supporters
There is currently one officially recognized supporters group, El Monstruo Verde.

Mascot
Throughout their history, a dragon was the club's official mascot. On March 9, 2014, the club, after consultation with the fans, decided to call their mascot Mito .

Rivalries
Dragón's main rival is Águila. The derby has been labelled Derbi Migueleño (the San Miguel Derby).
The intense feelings between the two sides began early on due to the close proximity and the switching of players between the clubs. The biggest defection occurred in the 1950s when legendary players Juan Francisco Barraza, Esteban Blanco and left the championship side of Dragon to Aguila and started a dynasty. The sole final played between the two teams ended 1–0 to Dragon. The most recent match was a 1-0 victory by Dragon on the 15th of February, 2023.  The teams have played 81 matches in all competitions, Aguila winning 46, Dragon 12, and the remaining 23 having been drawn.

Sponsorship
Companies that Dragon currently has sponsorship deals with for 2023–2024 includes:
 Tony Sports – Official Kit Suppliers
 Pollo Campenese – Official sponsors
 Canal 4 – Official sponsors
 Devins Rosticeria – Official sponsors
 Hotel Real Centre – Official sponsors
 Hotel Marbella – Official sponsors
 UFTOR  – Official sponsors
 Las Perlitas – Official sponsors
 Electrolit – Official sponsors
 777Bingo – Official sponsors
 Natiluss Gym – Official sponsors

Honours
Dragon is historically the second most successful team from San Miguel in El Salvador football, as they have won the second most championships with 3 titles.

Domestic honours

Leagues
 Primera División Salvadorean and predecessors 
 Champions (3) : 1951, 1953, 2016 Clausura
 Segunda División Salvadorean and predecessors 
 Champions (5) :  1977, 1988–89, 1994–95, 2013 Clausura, 2022 Clausura
 Play-off winners: 2021-22
 Tercera División Salvadorean and predecessors 
 Champions (1) : Clausura 2013

Minor Cups
 El Salvador Benefit Tournament 
 Champions (1) : 2000
 Copa de la Historia 
 Champions (1) : 2015
 Copa Roberto "Burra"  Rivas 
 Champions (1) : 2016

Current squad
:

Players with dual citizenship
   TBD

Out on loan

In

Out

Reserve Category Football
As of: September 21, 2022

Personnel

Coaching staff
As of January 2023

Management

Notable players

Team captains

Notable managers

The club's current manager is Marvin Benitez. There have been TBD permanent and TBD caretaker managers of Dragon since the appointment of the club's first professional manager, Jorge El Choco Méndez in 1951. The club's longest-serving manager, in terms of both length of tenure and number of games overseen, is Jose Mario Martinez, who managed the club between 1996 and 2018. Argentinian Gregorio Bundio was also Dragon's first manager from outside the El Salvador.
Overall Jose Mario Martinez is the club's most successful coach, winning two Segunda División Salvadorean, Followed by one title each in the Primera División by Jorge El Choco Méndez, Miguel Herrera and  Omar Sevilla.

Records
Debut in the primera division: 2–3 TBD, Estadio Santaneco, 1950s
Highest league position: 1st in the Primera division (Apertura 1999, Apertura 2000)
Best post season finish: Runners up (Apertura 1999, Apertura 2000)
Record League victory: 8–3 vs. Dragón (Primera Division, May 2003)
Largest Home victory, Primera División: 4-1 v TBD, 2 February 2020
Largest Away victory, Primera División: 3-0 v TBD, 29 October 2018
Largest Home loss, Primera División: 1–3 v TBD, 4 November 2018
Largest Away loss, Primera División: 1-4 v TBD, 7 April 2019
Record attendance at Estadio Jose Ramon Flores : 25,133 v TBD, Primera Division (TBD)
Most League appearances: 317, TBD (TBD)
Most League goals scored: total, Tbd, TBD (1998–2003)
Most League goals scored, season: 13, 
Worst season: TBD 2002-2003: 0 win, 0 draws and 0 losses (0 points)
Debut in Concacaf Competition: 2016–17 CONCACAF Champions League
First CONCACAF Champions League match: Dragon 1–2 Portland Timbers; TBD; 3, August 2016.

Individual records
 Record appearances (all competitions): TBD, 822 from 1957 to 1975
 Record appearances (Primera Division): Paraguayan TBD, 64 from 2018 to 2019
 Most capped player for El Salvador: 68 (17 whilst at Dragon), Raúl Díaz Arce
 Most international caps for El Salvador while a Dragon player: 17, TBD
 Most caps won whilst at Dragon: 17, TBD.
 Record scorer in league: TBD, 77
 First goal scorer in International competition: Jamaican Kenrod Howell  (v. Portland Timbers; TBD; 3 August 2020)
 Most goals in a season (all competitions): TBD, 62 (1927/28) (47 in League, 15 in Cup competitions)
 Most goals in a season (Primera Division): TBD (Clausura 2001) and TBD (Apertura 2016), 13
 Longest streak without conceding a goal: TBD 495 minutes (TBD) 
 First international to play for Dragon– TBD, 1973 (El Salvador 1967-1972)
 First Dragon international – TBD (for El Salvador v TBD, 1940s)
 Fastest goal scored for Dragon: Uruguayan Jorge Garay (7 seconds) vs ADET, 1 May 2001
 Top goalscorer in CONCACAF competition: 1, Kevin Howell and Melara

Top goalscorers 

Note: ''Players in bold text are still active with Dragon

Overall seasons table in Primera División de Fútbol Profesional
{|class="wikitable"
|-bgcolor="#efefef"
! Pos.
! Club
! Season In D1
! Pl.
! W
! D
! L
! GS
! GA
! Dif.
|-
|align=center bgcolor=|TBA
|C.D. Dragon
|align=center |65
|align=center|930
|align=center|269
|align=center|263
|align=center|398
|align=center|1189
|align=center|1452
|align=center|-263
|}

Last updated: 7 October 2021

Distinction to history of club goals.

Individual trophies

Other departments

Football

Reserve team
The reserve team serves mainly as the final stepping stone for promising young players under the age of 21 before being promoted to the main team. The second team is coached by Manuel Acevedo. the team played in the Primera División Reserves, they have yet to reach win or reach a final at the Reserve championships

Junior teams
The youth team (under 17 and under 15) has produced some of El Salvador's top football players, including TBD and TBD.

Women's team
The women's first team, which is led by head coach Manuel Acevedo, features several members of the El Salvador national ladies team. Their greatest successes were reaching the semi finals the in Apertura 2020.

References

External links
 Profile – Cero a Cero
  (history)

Football clubs in El Salvador
Association football clubs established in 1939
1939 establishments in El Salvador